Parambia is a genus of moths of the family Crambidae.

Species
Parambia cedroalis 
Parambia gnomosynalis Dyar, 1914
Parambia paigniodesalis

References

Natural History Museum Lepidoptera genus database

Glaphyriinae
Crambidae genera
Taxa named by Harrison Gray Dyar Jr.